Nikos Politis (Νίκος Ε. Πολίτης, died 2005) was a Greek writer, journalist, and historian of Patras and sports.

He wrote many books, all of them about Patras and its history.  He is one of the greatest historians in Patras together with Stefanos Thomopoulos.

Filmography

Film

References

Sources and references
The Beautiful Stupid People in Old Patras, Doros and the People's Press, Nikos Politis, Achaikes Publishers, Patras, 1999, 

2005 deaths
Writers from Patras
Greek journalists
Year of birth unknown